Alethia Tanner, née Alethia "Lethe" Browning, (1781–1864) was an American educator. She was a leader in the African American community of the District of Columbia in the early 1800s, known for freeing 18 people from slavery and providing support for the creation of Washington DC's first school for free black children.

Biography 
Alethia “Lethe" Browning Tanner was born in 1781 on a plantation owned by Tobias and Mary Belt, in Prince George's County, MD. Alethia had two sisters, Sophia (Bell) and Laurena (Cook). Upon the death of Mary Pratt (Tobias had predeceased his wife) in 1795, the plantation, known as Chelsea Plantation was inherited by their daughter Rachel Belt Pratt. Mary Belt's will stipulated that Laurena be sent to live with a sibling of Rachel Pratt's while Sophia and Alethia were to stay at the Chelsea Plantation.

At some point, both Sophia and Alethia were allowed to grow and sell vegetables at markets in Alexandria and DC. Alethia sold vegetables at market across from the White House. There are also evidence, via doctor's bill for Thomas Jefferson, that Alethia worked in Thomas Jefferson's White House. Her role there is unknown. Curiously, the man who bought Alethia from Rachel Prattwas a man by the name of Joseph Doughtery. Doughtery was Thomas Jefferson's footman while Jefferson was President. It is believed that Alethia gave the funds to Doughtery so that he could purchase her and then manumit her. Doughtery manumitted Aletha a few days after he purchased her. One of the witnesses on her manumission papers in 1810 was William Thornton, the architect of the US Capitol.

In 1826, and for several years after, Alethia was able to save enough money to purchase the freedom for her sister Laurena, Laurena's husband, their children, and many of her family and friends. Among Laurena's children was John Francis Cook, Sr., who became schoolmaster of Union Seminary, where he would establish the church and serve as its first pastor. He also founded the Young Man's Moral and Literary Society, an antebellum abolitionist debating society for free and enslaved blacks, and co-founded Union Bethel AME Church and Fifteenth Street Presbyterian Church. During the Snow Riots of 1835, Cook temporarily fled the city, when a white mob attacked and burned down the one-room schoolhouse.

Alethia led a remarkable life. She was a business woman, owned real estate, and was a supporter and sponsor of educational and religious institutions for the free black community in Washington DC. She was a Methodist church member in part because she was drawn to their position on slavery. Later, she and other African American former slaves left the church, finding it unwelcoming because they did not want to be confined to the galleria in the church. Alethia and her sister and her sister's husband joined Israel Bethel African Methodist Episcopal Church and later purchased it when it was being sold in auction. When she died she was a member of Union Bethel Church which was established with the help of her nephew John Francis Cook Sr.

The Bell School

Altheia, George, Nicholas Franklin and Moses Liverpool started the first school for free black children in the District of Columbia, called The Bell School, in 1807. The Bell School failed from lack of funding and a small student base, leading to the formation of The Resolute Beneficial Society School. This school like the last failed, largely attributed to limitations caused by segregation. Smaller private schools were then opened. Alethia's safety was in danger due to the Snow Riot in August 1835, which started as a labor strike but extended into attacks on free blacks. Her nephew John Francis Cook fled, but there was no record of her fleeing the area.

Legacy 
Tanner Park, a 2.5-acre park in the NoMa neighborhood of Washington, DC, was named after Alethia Tanner by a community vote.

See also
 Louisa Parke Costin

References

External sources
Sharp, John G, Washington D.C Genealogy Trails Biographies. 2006-2013
 

History of slavery in Maryland
19th century in Washington, D.C.
People from Washington, D.C.
19th-century American educators
Founders of schools in the United States
18th-century American slaves
19th-century American businesspeople
19th-century American businesswomen
1781 births
1864 deaths
18th-century African-American women
19th-century African-American women
19th-century American women educators
19th-century philanthropists
Black slave owners in the United States